Cotton is a small village and civil parish located in the Mid Suffolk district of Suffolk in eastern England. Cotton lies a few miles to the east of the Great Eastern Main Line and to the west of the A140. Nearby villages include Mendlesham and Bacton, and the parish also includes the small hamlet of Dandy Corner.  Its precise location is 4½ miles north east of its post town, Stowmarket, and 2½ miles north west of Mendlesham.

In 2005 its population was 510 and according to the 2011 census, the total population had increased by 16 to 526.

In the 1870s, Cotton was described as 
"a parish in Hartismere district, Suffolk; on the Eastern Union railway, 1½ mile S of Finningham r. station, and 6 N by E of Stowmarket. The church is good; and there is a Wesleyan chapel, a parochial school, and charities."

Population

Between 1801 and 2011, according to UK Census data, the population of Cotton has fluctuated quite a lot. In 1801, the population of the village was 441; it continued to rise until it reached its peak population in 1831 of a population of 585. It then began to steadily decrease for several decades until 1951 where the village reached its lowest recorded population of 363. This could have affected the economy and industry of Cotton, as the workforce was dwindling. However, after this point in 1951, the population began to gradually increase again and in 2011 it was recorded to be 526.

Religion
Cotton appears to be a one religion parish, of the 526 people living in Cotton in 2011, 368 declared themselves as being part of the Christian religion, only 1 Buddhist and 159 either of no religion or not stating their religion. In 2001, there were 489 people living in Cotton, and of these, 420 were of a Christian faith. There were no other religions declared in the 2001 census, only 69 people who either didn't state their religion or had no religion.

Church
St Andrew's Church, located on Church Street is the local place of Church of England worship for Cotton, which is classified under the Diocese of St Edmundsbury & Ipswich. It is a listed building which holds services twice a month and several other special services throughout the year.

Housing
In 2011, there was a recorded 225 household in Cotton. This had increased since 2001 where it was recorded to be 205. The most common type of household in 2011, according to the Census data was married couple households with no dependent children. This type of household accounted for nearly half of the total households.

Occupation

In 1881, there was a large male and female divide concerning choice of occupations.  The most popular occupation for males was working in the agricultural industry and the most popular choice for females was working as part of the domestic services or in offices.  With a population of 506 in 1881, 77 males worked in agriculture and 16 females worked in domestic services. In 2011 there was 263 people between the ages of 16 and 74 who were in employment. 34 were in a managerial occupation, 34 in a professional career, 55 in the skilled trade industry, and just 18 people operating plant machinery. This is very different to the 1881 career distribution, as it has shifted 
from an agricultural-based workforce to a more service-based workforce, in both men and women.

Land
The total area of the parish is 7,556.35m2. The vast majority of the land use in Cotton is greenspace, with 7,111.22m2 of land being green, agricultural area.  Domestic land use – i.e. residential areas – comprise 29.55m2 of the parish and 19.18m2 is non-domestic land use.

References

External links

Villages in Suffolk
Civil parishes in Suffolk
Mid Suffolk District